Stenocorus schaumii is a species of beetle of the family Cerambycidae that is  long. The colour is either black or brownish-red. Like other members of the genus, it has wide shoulders and tuberculated sides of the pronotum, with wrinkled elytron. Their larvae feed on Fraxinus, maple, and other hardwood plants.

References

Lepturinae
Beetles described in 1850